St Joseph's Church is a Roman Catholic parish church in Newbury, Berkshire, England. It was built from 1926 to 1928 in the Italianate style. It is located on the corner of London Road and Western Avenue north of the town centre. According to Historic England, the church is a "major local landmark".

History

Foundation
In 1852, from St Mary's Church in Woolhampton, a Fr Robert Hodgson started a mission in Newbury. In 1853, he bought a house in Newbury, 105 London Road and the surrounding land for construction of a new church. The house became both a presbytery and a small school. In 1864, a small church was built next to the house. It cost £800.

Construction

By the early twentieth century, the church was too small for the increasing local Catholic population. Funds were raised by the priest, Canon Francis Green. He went to Newbury Racecourse railway station when there were races at Newbury Racecourse to ask for money from people when they were leaving after the races. On 19 January 1926, the foundation stone was laid. The church was designed by Wilfred Clarence Mangan, an architect from Preston, who also designed the Church of Our Lady of Hal, Camden, English Martyrs Church, Reading, and the extension at St James's Church, Reading. The builders were the local firm Hoskings & Pond Ltd. On 21 November 1928, the church was opened. The total cost was around £20,000. The old church on London Road became the church hall. On 18 June 1978, a new altar in the church was consecrated by Anthony Emery, the Bishop of Portsmouth.

Parish
St Joseph's Church is its own parish in Newbury. It has two Sunday Masses at 8:30am and 11:00am.

See also
 Roman Catholic Diocese of Portsmouth

References

External links
 

Buildings and structures in Newbury, Berkshire
Roman Catholic churches in Berkshire
Italianate architecture in England
1864 establishments in England
Roman Catholic churches completed in 1928
20th-century Roman Catholic church buildings in the United Kingdom
Religious organizations established in 1864